Battlestar Galactica: The Resistance is the collective title of 10 two- to five-minute "webisodes" (also known as a web series) released exclusively on the World Wide Web through the Sci Fi Channel's website. The serial storyline follows events that occur between the close of season 2 and the beginning of season 3 of the re-imagined Battlestar Galactica TV series.

The first webisode was released on September 5, 2006, with two subsequent webisodes posted to the site each week through October 5 to lead into the season 3 premiere. The original title of this series was to be Battlestar Galactica: Crossroads but "Crossroads" was later used as the title of the third-season finale instead.

The series was produced as a promotional event to promote Battlestar Galactica, and as such generates no residuals for its writers. The WGA has called for the boycott of all un-residualed webisodes by writers and producers (though the WGA does not represent producers) from working on them.

The webisodes are only available for viewers from the United States, to the dismay of many fans worldwide; the decision to restrict the webisodes to the US has forced international fans to use peer-to-peer networks to get content which is supposedly free. The webisodes were later reposted on various free video hosting sites, such as YouTube but have since been removed at "the request of copyright owner NBC Universal because its content was used without permission". In late 2006, with Australia's Network Ten broadcasting of the third season of Battlestar Galactica on Ten HD, The Resistance webisodes were made available to the Australian public (Region 4) on the network's website but have since been taken down.

The webisodes were released on disc 2 of the Region 1 season three DVD set, with the option to play each episode individually or all together with title cards separating the chapters. The webisodes were included in the Region 2 set (since 2014 edition) and in the Region 4 DVD set (Season 4, Part 1), and are present on all Blu-ray versions.

Plot

The series documents the events on planet New Caprica after the invasion by the Cylons at the end of the second season. It shows the activities of the resistance to Cylon occupation, and collaborators for the Cylons.

The resistance is headed by Colonel Saul Tigh, formerly XO of Galactica, and highest-ranking military officer on New Caprica. He is joined by new parents Chief Tyrol and Specialist Cally, former Galactica crewman Jammer, and Caprica resistance fighter Jean Barolay.

The series begins on the 67th day of Cylon occupation. It is learned that among the Cylons' first acts of occupation was the building of a detention center. The Cylons have also started recruiting for a human New Caprica Police (NCP) force. Former Galactica pilot Duck, whom Jammer has been courting for the resistance, condemns the NCP as collaborators but is reluctant to get involved with Tigh's group because he is newly married. As the series progresses, Duck's wife Nora is killed in a Cylon attack on a temple where Tigh and his team were storing weapons.

Although the tragedy kills 10 people, Tigh sees the opportunity to win support over to the resistance. Jammer is torn about the event, since he believed storing weapons in a temple was a sin. He is taken to a private meeting with an Aaron Doral Cylon, where he is asked to support the Cylons' plan for peace, by reporting on any more resistance movement.

Afterwards, Jammer is given a chip (to report Resistance activity) and along with other resistance operatives, attends the baptismal of Nicholas Tyrol. Colonel Tigh has started plans to manufacture explosives near a hospital due to increased size of the resistance. It is discovered that in an act of revenge, Duck has joined the New Caprica Police as a spy for the resistance. Meanwhile, it is assumed that Jammer has become a Cylon collaborator - both men, ironically, becoming the very things they resisted earlier.

Webisodes

Bradley Thompson, who co-wrote the webisodes, explained in a post on Scifi.com that the webisodes were not created as 10 individual standalone-stories, but were written as one truncated episode (~26 minutes long as opposed to the normal 40 minute run-time), filmed, and then cut into 10 segments. As such, the entire "webisode series" is one "story" and individual webisodes are not necessarily viewable on their own or out of sequence.

Cast
 Michael Hogan as Saul Tigh
 Aaron Douglas as Galen Tyrol
 Nicki Clyne as Cally Tyrol
 Dominic Zamprogna as James "Jammer" Lyman
 Christian Tessier as Tucker "Duck" Clellan
 Matthew Bennett as Number Five
 Alisen Down as Jean Barolay
 Emily Holmes as Nora Clellan

See also 

 Battlestar Galactica episode list
 Battlestar Galactica franchise
 Battlestar Galactica (2004 TV series), the reimagined universe

References 

2006 web series debuts
2006 web series endings
Razor Flashbacks
Razor Flashbacks
American science fiction web series